Frederik Wilhelm "Willy" Bohlander (8 August 1891 – 26 August 1939) was a Dutch male water polo player. He was a member of the Netherlands men's national water polo team. He competed with the team at the 1924 Summer Olympics.

His brother, Gé Bohlander, was also a water polo player and competed for the national team at the 1920 and 1924 Summer Olympics.

References

External links
 

1891 births
1939 deaths
Dutch male water polo players
Water polo players at the 1924 Summer Olympics
Olympic water polo players of the Netherlands
Water polo players from Amsterdam